Roseivirga thermotolerans is a Gram-negative, strictly aerobic and non-spore-forming bacterium from the genus of Roseivirga.

References

Cytophagia
Bacteria described in 2016